The 1987 Sonoma State Cossacks football team represented Sonoma State University as a member of the Northern California Athletic Conference (NCAC) during the 1987 NCAA Division II football season. Led by first-year head coach Marty Fine, Sonoma State compiled an overall record of 5–6 with a mark of 2–3 in conference play, tying for fourth place in the NCAC. The team was outscored by its opponents 257 to 184 for the season. The Cossacks played home games at Cossacks Stadium in Rohnert Park, California.

Schedule

Notes

References

Sonoma State
Sonoma State Cossacks football seasons
Sonoma State Cossacks football